European route E 607 is a European B class road in France, connecting the cities Digoin and Chalon-sur-Saône.

Route 
 
 Digoin
 Chalon-sur-Saône

External links 
 UN Economic Commission for Europe: Overall Map of E-road Network (2007)
 International E-road network

Roads in France